Lucky for Life (LFL) is a lottery drawing game, which, as of June 28, 2021, is available in 22 states and the District of Columbia. Lucky for Life, which began in 2009 in Connecticut as Lucky-4-Life, became a New England–wide game three years later, and added eleven lotteries during 2015. LFL's slogan is "The Game of a Lifetime". Drawings are performed by the Multi-State Lottery Association (MUSL) using a digital drawing system to pick the numbers . Lucky for Life is drawn nightly (7 days a week) at approximately 10:30 p.m. Eastern Time.

Lucky for Life was modified on September 17, 2013, adding a second "lifetime" prize tier, and a cash option for either annuity tier; LFL was modified again in January 2015 to its current format. Each Lucky for Life play costs $2.

The District of Columbia joined Lucky for Life (the first member added without changing the game's double matrix) on February 15, 2015, Kentucky on March 22, 2015, Ohio on November 15, 2015, Iowa on January 24, 2016, North Carolina on February 7, 2016, North Dakota on February 26, 2016, Colorado on July 17, 2016, Kansas on November 15, 2016, Wyoming on December 4, 2016, South Dakota on June 4, 2017, Nebraska on August 20, 2017, and Oklahoma on February 25, 2018. This gave Lucky for Life 26 members.

As of June 28, 2021, Missouri, South Carolina, and Minnesota have dropped out of Lucky for Life, with Missouri switching to the rival "Cash4Life"

First and second-prize payouts

Unlike other American lottery games (the exception being the 10-state Cash4Life) Lucky for Life offers two annuitized prize levels; both are advertised as "lifetime" prizes. Beginning with the 2013 game modification, a first-prize winner can choose cash in lieu of the lifetime annuity; second-prize winners also are offered a cash option. A first-prize winner, if the annuity is chosen, receives, or shares, the equivalent of "$365,000 a YEAR, FOR LIFE" (the timing of the payments is according to the rules where the ticket was sold), with a 20-year guarantee; if the winner dies, payments continue to the winner's estate. Second prize is $25,000 A YEAR, FOR LIFE.

Lucky for Life's double matrix, used beginning in January 2015, is 5 of 48 white balls and 1 of 18 green "Lucky Balls". The original, Connecticut-only version, was 4 of 39 white balls and 1 of 19 green balls; hence the name Lucky-4-Life. The format upon the change to its current name was 5/40 + 1/21; the 2013 game modification (including the new second "lifetime" prize tier and the introduction of a cash option) had 43 balls in each of the two drums.

The 5/43 + 1/43 version never produced a top prize-winning ticket; the first winner under the current matrix was sold in South Carolina for the November 19, 2015 drawing. The winner, who claimed the prize anonymously under SCEL rules, was the first winner to choose cash in lieu of the annuity for the game's top prize, as all previous top prize winners are receiving their winnings under the game's pre-2013 rules.

Odds and prizes
A player wins a prize according to the following chart (effective January 27, 2015):

† First-prize cash option is $5,750,000; multiple winners share the top prize regardless of payment option(s) chosen. Second-prize cash option is $390,000. The cash option amounts are decided by a unanimous vote of the LFL lotteries; these amounts are posted at least 30 days before the change(s) occur.
 
‡ Second and third prizes also have liability limits.

The prize pool is approximately 60 percent of sales.

The overall odds of winning are 1:7.8.

Participating lotteries

Twenty-two states and D.C. currently participate in Lucky for Life. Three states formerly participated in the drawing but have since stopped.

† Original member; game started as Lucky-4-Life. Connecticut continues to host the drawings.

‡ The minimum age to play Lucky for Life in Iowa is 21, while in Nebraska it is 19; elsewhere it is 18.

Former members
Missouri ended sales of Lucky for Life on April 8, 2021, switching to Cash4Life three days later.

South Carolina and Minnesota left Lucky For Life after the drawing on June 28, 2021.

See also
 Cash4Life, a similar game offered in Florida, Georgia, Indiana, Maryland, Missouri, New Jersey, New York, Pennsylvania, Tennessee, and Virginia

References

External links 

 

Lottery games in the United States